Mohamed Khalifa may refer to:

 Mohamed Abdel Aziz Khalifa (born 1925), Egyptian swimmer
 Mohamed Asswai Khalifa (born 1944), Libyan hurdler
 Mohamed Khalifa (footballer) (born 1986), Egyptian footballer
 Mohamed Ould Khalifa (born 1968), Mauritanian long-distance runner
 Mohammed Jamal Khalifa (1957–2007), Saudi businessman